Vladimir Nikolayevich Serov (born 9 September 1979) is a former Russian professional football player.

Club career
He played in the Russian Football National League for FC Chernomorets Novorossiysk in 2004.

References

External links
 

1979 births
Living people
Russian footballers
Association football forwards
FC Chernomorets Novorossiysk players
FC Rotor Volgograd players
FC Fakel Voronezh players
FC Sokol Saratov players
FC Dynamo Stavropol players
FC Lada-Tolyatti players